Sara Anita Sommerfeld (born 28 October 1977) is a Swedish actress.

Sara Sommerfeld was born in Sollentuna north of Stockholm. Her parents are Polish-Jewish immigrants who came to Sweden in 1968. Sara Sommerfeld started as a child actress at age ten. After she graduated from the Swedish National Theatre Academy in Gothenburg in 2001, she has acted in several feature films, TV series, radio shows and voice overs, and performed at different theatres in Sweden.

Filmography 
 Maskrosbarn (1989, TV series)
 Kaninmannen (1990)
 Den goda viljan (1992)
 Sökarna (1993)
 Free Willy 2: The Adventure Home (1995) (Swedish voice)
 Vänner och Fiender (1996, TV series)
 Noll tolerans (1999) (not credited)
 Vingar av glas (2000)
 Atlantis: The Lost Empire (2001) (Swedish voice)
 Minoes (2001) (Swedish voice)
 Tsatsiki – vänner för alltid (2001)
 Hem till Midgård (2003, TV series)
 Hjärtslag (2004)
 Shark Tale (2004) (Swedish voice)
 En decemberdröm (2005, TV series)
 Babas bilar (2006)
 Beck – Advokaten (2006)
 Göta kanal 3 - Kanalkungens hemlighet (2010)

External links 
Personal Interview with Sara Sommerfeld in Sweden, Reported by Leadel.NET

Actresses from Stockholm
Swedish people of Polish-Jewish descent
Swedish Jews
Swedish actresses
Living people
1977 births